Contents Dislodged During Shipment is an album by American rock band Tin Huey, released in 1979 by Warner Bros. Records. Most of it was written by the band's frontman, Chris Butler.  Even though their cover of The Monkees' "I'm a Believer" was a minor hit, Contents Dislodged During Shipment was a commercial failure and Warner Bros. dropped the band in early 1980.

Critical reception 
Reviewing in Christgau's Record Guide: Rock Albums of the Seventies (1981), Robert Christgau wrote: "They get arch at times, both lyrically (e.g., the 'surreal' 'Puppet Wipes') and in rhythm changes and instrumental breaks that betray an art-rock heritage. But like Pere Ubu, these Akron boys make art-rock that rocks, with chops you can enjoy for all the music's sake. And if their humor is collegiate, I'm a sophomore."

Track listing
"I'm a Believer" (Neil Diamond)     3:16
"The Revelations of Dr. Modesto" (Harvey Gold)     3:57
"I Could Rule The World if I Could Only Get the Parts" (Chris Butler)     3:17
"Coronation" (Chris Butler, Harvey Gold)    2:25
"Slide" (Chris Butler)    2:40
"Hump Day" (Chris Butler)    2:59
"Pink Berets" (Chris Butler, Harvey Gold)    3:04
"Squirm You Worm" (Harvey Gold, Mark Price)    2:32
"Chinese Circus" (Harvey Gold, Michael Aylward) 1:48
"Puppet Wipes" (Harvey Gold, Ralph Carney)      2:35
"New York's Finest Dining Experience" (Harvey Gold, Michael Aylward)    3:00

Personnel
Chris Butler - guitar, percussion, birdcalls, vocals
Harvey Gold - piano, synthesizer, guitar, vocals
Michael Aylward - guitar, slide guitar, vocals
Mark Price - bass, vocals
Stuart Austin - drums, percussion, Synare drum synthesizer, vocals
Ralph Carney - bass, tenor, alto and soprano saxophone, clarinet, organ, percussion, piano, harmonica, vocals, "large nose, duck calls"

References 

1979 albums
Tin Huey albums
Warner Records albums